Ro-23, originally named Submarine No. 41, was an Imperial Japanese Navy Kaichū-Type submarine of the Kaichū III subclass. She was commissioned in 1923 as the final unit of the Kaichu III subclass and operated in the waters of Japan, Formosa, and Chōsen before she was stricken in 1935.

Design and description
They displaced  surfaced and  submerged.

For surface running, the submarines were powered by two  Sulzer Mark II diesel engines, each driving one propeller shaft. When submerged each propeller was driven by a  electric motor. They could reach  on the surface and  underwater.

The submarines were armed with six  torpedo tubes, four internal tubes in the bow and two external tubes mounted on the upper deck, and carried a total of ten Type 44 torpedoes. They were also armed with a single  deck gun mounted aft of the conning tower.

Construction and commissioning

Ro-23 was laid down as Submarine No. 41 on 20 January 1921 by the Yokosuka Naval Arsenal at Yokosuka, Japan. Launched on 25 October 1921, she was completed and commissioned on 28 April 1923 as the final submarine of the Kaichu III subclass.

Service history

Upon commissioning, Submarine No. 41 was attached to the Sasebo Naval District, to which she remained attached throughout her career. On 15 June 1923, she was assigned to Submarine Division 22 and to the Sasebo Defense Division, and on 1 November 1924 she was renamed Ro-23'''. On 1 December 1924, Submarine Division 22 was reassigned to the Chinkai Defense Division on the southern coast of Chōsen.  Submarine Division 22 returned to the Sasebo Defense Division on 1 December 1925, serving in it until 15 November 1934, and thereafter operated directly under the control of the Sasebo Naval District.Ro-23 was stricken from the Navy list on 1 April 1935. She was hulked on 7 August 1935 and renamed Hulk No. 3106.Notes

References, History of Pacific War Vol.17 I-Gō Submarines, Gakken (Japan), January 1998, Rekishi Gunzō, History of Pacific War Extra, "Perfect guide, The submarines of the Imperial Japanese Forces", Gakken (Japan), March 2005, The Maru Special, Japanese Naval Vessels No.43 Japanese Submarines III, Ushio Shobō (Japan), September 1980, Book code 68343-44The Maru Special, Japanese Naval Vessels No.132 Japanese Submarines I "Revised edition", Ushio Shobō (Japan), February 1988, Book code 68344-36The Maru Special, Japanese Naval Vessels No.133 Japanese Submarines II "Revised edition", Ushio Shobō (Japan), March 1988, Book code 68344-37The Maru Special, Japanese Naval Vessels No.135 Japanese Submarines IV'', Ushio Shobō (Japan), May 1988, Book code 68344-39

Ro-16-class submarines
Kaichū type submarines
Ships built by Yokosuka Naval Arsenal
1921 ships